Zack Taylor is an American politician who served as a member of the Oklahoma Senate from the 28th district from August 4, 2020 to the end of the 2022 term. He previously served as a member of the Oklahoma House of Representatives from 2017 to 2019. In April 2022, he announced he would not seek another term and he was retiring from the Oklahoma Senate.

Education 
Taylor earned a Bachelor of Science degree in aviation management and finance from Oklahoma State University–Stillwater.

Career 
Taylor is a partner at RKR Exploration, an oil and gas company. He is also a private pilot. Taylor represented the 28th district in the Oklahoma House of Representatives from 2017 to 2019. Taylor served as chair of the House Rules Committee. He was then elected to the Oklahoma Senate in an August 2020 special election. He also serves as vice chair of the Senate Energy Committee.

References 

Living people
Oklahoma State University alumni
Republican Party Oklahoma state senators
Republican Party members of the Oklahoma House of Representatives
People from Seminole, Oklahoma
21st-century American politicians
Year of birth missing (living people)